Monk is a crater on Mercury. Its name was adopted by the International Astronomical Union in 2013, after American jazz musician and composer Thelonious Monk.

References

Impact craters on Mercury